Sándor Font (born 23 November 1960 in Soltvadkert, Hungary) is a member of the National Assembly of Hungary (Országgyűlés) for Kiskőrös from 1998 to 2014 and for Kalocsa since 2014. He was elected to his first term in 1998. He is a Fidesz party member. He is married and has two daughters, Sára and Orsolya, and a son, Márk. He attends the Lutheran church in Soltvadkert.

He graduated from Budapest University of Technology and Economics in 1990, where he majored in engineering.

Font later attended Corvinus University of Budapest with a focus on economics.

Since 1989 he was a member of Hungarian Democratic Forum, than became a member of the city council in Soltvadkert. In 1994 he was running for a seat in the National Assembly of Hungary, but lost. He was elected in 1998 and became a member of the Agricultural, Budget, and Finance committees.

He is now a member of the Fidesz party.

Personal life
He is married. His wife is Ildikó Fontné Fehér. They have two daughters, Sára and Orsolya and a son, Márk.

References

External links
 Official site (Hungarian only)

1960 births
Living people
Hungarian Lutherans
People from Soltvadkert
Hungarian Democratic Forum politicians
Fidesz politicians
Members of the National Assembly of Hungary (1998–2002)
Members of the National Assembly of Hungary (2002–2006)
Members of the National Assembly of Hungary (2006–2010)
Members of the National Assembly of Hungary (2010–2014)
Members of the National Assembly of Hungary (2014–2018)
Members of the National Assembly of Hungary (2018–2022)
Members of the National Assembly of Hungary (2022–2026)
Corvinus University of Budapest alumni